Hendricks Township is a civil township of Mackinac County in the U.S. state of Michigan. The population was 153 at the 2010 census.

Communities 
It is on H-40. West of Caffey, H-40 is also known as the Hiawatha Trail. At Caffey Corner, the Hiawatha Trail branches off to the south to end at US 2 east of Epoufette. H-40 continues east from Caffey approximately seven miles to Trout Lake and from there on to Rudyard just west of I-75. Its station on the Minneapolis, St. Paul and Sault Ste. Marie Railway was originally called "Lewis", but because at the time there was another post office named Lewis in Michigan, it was given a post office named "Caffey", after the Pennsylvania-born Civil War veteran, William N. Caffey, who became the first postmaster in November 1899. The office closed in September 1909 and re-opened with Caffey as postmaster in June 1913. The post office closed permanently in December 1916.
In 1848, a government surveyor, John R. McLeod, found an Ojibwe village here. Amable Goudreau began a commercial fishing business here in 1859, but it did not get a post office until lumbering operations began. McLeod became the first postmaster in December 1879. The name, French for "place of rest", was given by early French settlers because it was believed that Father Jacques Marquette used the harbor as the first step on his trip down Lake Michigan from St. Ignace. A historical marker commemorating the fishing village was erected in 1986. A summer post office operated here from 1959 to 1965 and 1966–1972.
Fiborn Quarry was a settlement around a limestone quarry.

Geography

Demographics
As of the census of 2000, there were 183 people, 78 households, and 51 families residing in the township.  The population density was 2.3 per square mile (0.9/km2).  There were 173 housing units at an average density of 2.2 per square mile (0.8/km2).  The racial makeup of the township was 83.61% White, 10.93% Native American, 0.55% Asian, and 4.92% from two or more races. Hispanic or Latino of any race were 1.64% of the population.

There were 78 households, out of which 25.6% had children under the age of 18 living with them, 56.4% were married couples living together, 6.4% had a female householder with no husband present, and 34.6% were non-families. 29.5% of all households were made up of individuals, and 6.4% had someone living alone who was 65 years of age or older.  The average household size was 2.35 and the average family size was 2.82.

In the township the population was spread out, with 25.7% under the age of 18, 1.6% from 18 to 24, 29.0% from 25 to 44, 25.7% from 45 to 64, and 18.0% who were 65 years of age or older.  The median age was 40 years. For every 100 females, there were 110.3 males.  For every 100 females age 18 and over, there were 103.0 males.

The median income for a household in the township was $32,500, and the median income for a family was $33,906. Males had a median income of $27,083 versus $11,875 for females. The per capita income for the township was $13,772.  About 15.3% of families and 23.5% of the population were below the poverty line, including 35.0% of those under the age of eighteen and 18.6% of those 65 or over.

References

Townships in Mackinac County, Michigan
Townships in Michigan
Michigan populated places on Lake Michigan